Greußen is a town in the Kyffhäuserkreis district, in Thuringia, Germany. It is situated 17 km southeast of Sondershausen, and 29 km north of Erfurt. In January 2021 it absorbed the former municipalities Großenehrich and Wolferschwenda.

References

Kyffhäuserkreis
Schwarzburg-Sondershausen